West Midlands Chambers of Commerce LLP is a collaborative partnership of the 6 Chambers of Commerce in the West Midlands region of the United Kingdom. It brings together the regions Chambers of Commerce, which between them have over 9,000 companies as registered members.

Organisation
The head office of the WMCC is located in Birmingham, at the same address as the Greater Birmingham Chamber of Commerce. It operates through delivery teams based at the offices of its member chambers, giving it a total of six offices. As well as Birmingham these are located in Worcester, Stoke-on-Trent, Wolverhampton, Coventry and Telford.

The head of the WMCC is currently its Managing Director Allen Matty MBE, along with the chair of the Board Louise Bennett OBE DL. In total there are 21 employees within WMCC, the 6 regional Chambers employs a further 28 specialist International Trade advisers who support businesses in the region to develop there international trade potential

Membership
The West Midlands Chambers of Commerce LLP has six member chambers, each of which is an accredited member of the British Chambers of Commerce. The members are:

 Greater Birmingham Chambers of Commerce Group
 Black Country Chamber of Commerce
 Coventry and Warwickshire Chamber of Commerce
 Herefordshire and Worcestershire Chamber of Commerce
 Staffordshire Chambers of Commerce
 Shropshire Chamber of Commerce

Between them these chambers have a total membership of over 9,000 businesses.

Activities
The WMCC describes its core mission as "the delivery of specialist business services across the West Midlands" . A priority is developing international trade and investment in the West Midlands area.

The WMCC acts as a single point of contact for government agencies (The Department for International Trade) or other private sector entities who wish to place contracts for the delivery of business support services across the West Midlands region: it can act as both contractor and contract manager.

Emphasis on exports
The WMCC is working with businesses, and lobbying the government and local authorities, to increase the emphasis on exports for manufacturers based in the West Midlands.

In May 2013 WMCC introduced a new service aimed at making it easier for businesses to export. This involves providing a simple way to generate all the documentation required to ship goods overseas, including letters of credit, by using a centralised management system. This allows a business to enter the information once rather than having to do it repeatedly for each individual document. Online training courses are also being developed to teach business owners the special requirements of international trade.

References

West Midlands (region)